South Central Madness is the debut studio album by American rap group South Central Cartel. It was released on January 22, 1992 through Pump Records with distribution via Quality Records.

Track listing
County Bluz
Say Goodbye to the Badd Guyz
Ya Want Sum a Dis
Conspiracy
Neighborhood Jacka
U Gotta Deal wit Dis (Gangsta Luv)
I Get My Roll On
Ya Getz Clowned
Hookaz
Pops Was a Rolla
Think'n Bout My Brotha
South Central Madness
Livin' Like Gangstas

Sample credits
"County Bluz"
"I'm Gonna Love You Just a Little More Baby" by Barry White
"Hookaz"
"Rumors" by Timex Social Club
"Livin' Like Gangstas"
"It's Just Begun" by The Jimmy Castor Bunch
"Doo Wa Ditty (Blow That Thing)" by Zapp
"Neighborhood Jacka"
"Funky Drummer" by James Brown
"Hot Pants" by James Brown
"Get on the Good Foot" by James Brown
"Pops Was a Rolla"
"Papa Was a Rollin' Stone" by The Temptations
"Hot Pants (Bonus Beats)" by Bobby Byrd
"South Central Madness"
"Get Off Your Ass and Jam" by Funkadelic
"So Ruff, So Tuff" by Roger
"U Gotta Deal Wit Dis (Gangsta Luv)"
"La-La (Means I Love You)" by The Delfonics
"Be Alright" by Zapp
"Ya Getz Clowned"
"Rock Steady" by Aretha Franklin
"Think (About It)" by Lyn Collins
"More Bounce to the Ounce" by Zapp
"Big Ole Butt" by LL Cool J
"Ain't No Future in Yo' Frontin'" by MC Breed and DFC
"Conspiracy"
"Kool Is Back" by Funk, Inc.
"I Get My Roll On"
"Funky Drummer" by James Brown
"Boyz-n-the-Hood" by Eazy-E
"Tom's Diner" by DNA

Charts

References

External links

1991 debut albums
South Central Cartel albums
Albums produced by Prodeje